James Robert Smith (born June 28, 1957) is an American author. His first novel, The Flock,  was published August 2, 2006, by Five Star.

The Flock

The Flock is a 2006 novel by James Smith. The Flock is a contemporary eco-thriller about what can happen when man violates nature, and when nature fights back.

Plot
A remote Florida swamp has been targeted for theme park development, and the swamp's inhabitants are none too happy. It doesn't help that the residents are a colony of intelligent, prehistoric, dinosaur-like birds: terror birds. This flock of beasts has escaped the mass extinction that killed off the dinosaurs, relying on stealth, cunning, and killer instinct. The creatures have been living in secret.

As the developers push to have the recently discovered animals exterminated, a billionaire rogue environmentalist steps in to protect these rare, predatory creatures. A naïve young Fish and Wildlife officer finds himself caught in between these two forces and finds conflict.

Film adaptation
A film adaptation of The Flock has been optioned.

Publications 
"A Certain Kindness", Midnight Shambler No. 6

Footnotes

External links 
Official page

21st-century American novelists
American male novelists
Living people
1957 births
21st-century American male writers